The 2007–08 season was Derby County's 109th season and their worst season ever in the Football League, their 65th season in the top division of English football and their first season in the top flight since the 2001–02 season. They were promoted after beating West Bromwich Albion 1–0 in the 2007 Championship play-off final.

After a very poor start to the season, manager Billy Davies left the club on 26 November 2007 after winning only one game to be replaced by former Wigan Athletic manager Paul Jewell. Jewell failed to turn things around for Derby and the club spent most of the season at the foot of the table, recording a club and top-flight record run of 32 league games without a win.

Derby were officially relegated on 29 March 2008 after their 2–2 home draw with fellow strugglers Fulham and Birmingham City's 3–1 victory over Manchester City left them 19 points away from safety with only 6 games left. This made Derby the first club in Premiership history to be relegated in March and the first since Sheffield United in 1975-76 to go down from the top flight from that month, only the second time it has ever happened in post-war English Football league history. They also accumulated the league's lowest points total since the introduction of 3 points for a win with just 11 points, as well as the record for the fewest wins in a Premier League season with just 1 victory in 38 games; also most defeats (29), fewest goals scored (20), most goals conceded in a 38-game season (89), longest run without victory (32 matches), and earliest relegation (29 March).

Review
Despite producing a reasonably good performance in a 2–2 draw against Portsmouth on the opening day of the season, followed by a narrow 1–0 defeat away to Sven-Göran Eriksson's Manchester City (the only two games which Derby spent outside the bottom three), Derby made a generally disastrous start to the Premier League season. Following their 6–0 defeat to Liverpool on 1 September 2007, Irish bookmakers Paddy Power decided to pay out on the club to be relegated after just five games of the new season. The poor start saw fans accuse Gadsby and the board of failing to invest properly in players for the club. The repercussions of this saw Trevor Birch leave his position as Chief Executive on 19 October 2007 and, on 29 October 2007, Gadsby stepped down as chairman to be replaced by former Hull City owner Adam Pearson.

Meanwhile, results on the pitch were not improving, with another poor performance away to Aston Villa followed up by a 5–0 home defeat against a West Ham United side ravaged by injuries. After taking just 6 points from 14 matches, including their only win of the season with a 1-0 victory against Newcastle United, Davies left by mutual consent after a meeting with Adam Pearson, taking nearly all of his newly assembled backroom staff with him. The club had just been beaten 2–0 at home to Chelsea and were rooted to the bottom of the table. After the game, Davies had publicly criticised Derby's board for a lack of investment. Some critics believed that Davies was a victim of his own success after overachieving in his first season at Pride Park, while others cited his apparent tactical inefficiencies at top flight level, poor big money signings (including £3m Claude Davis) and suggested Davies had engineered his own departure, in the form of an outspoken rant against the board so as to avoid having a relegation on his CV.

Within two days of Davies's dismissal, on 26 November 2007, Derby appointed highly rated former Wigan Athletic manager Paul Jewell. He initially appointed Stan Ternent as his assistant but, when Ternent left to become Huddersfield Town manager in April, Jewell moved to appoint Chris Hutchings who had been his assistant at both Bradford City and Wigan. Jewell's first match in charge was a 1–0 defeat away at Sunderland on 1 December 2007, the winning goal coming in stoppage time. Although performances improved under Jewell, results didn't. The team developed a habit of conceding late goals and following the defeat to Sunderland, Derby conceded late winners or equalisers in seven games between late December 2007 and late January 2008, dropping seven points from games they had been winning or drawing. Many at the club had in fact already accepted relegation by the end of December 2007.

Jewell was busy in the January 2008 transfer window, selling several players and bringing eight new players in, namely Everton defender Alan Stubbs, Argentine striker Emanuel Villa, ex-England international defender Danny Mills on loan from Manchester City, Blackburn midfielder Robbie Savage, French winger Laurent Robert, Tottenham's Egyptian midfielder Hossam Ghaly on loan, Gençlerbirliği's Mile Sterjovski and Rangers goalkeeper Roy Carroll.

On 28 January 2008, it was announced that Derby had been purchased by American group General Sports and Entertainment, with Tom Glick taking the role of new President and Chief Executive. Derby's relegation was confirmed on 29 March, the first time a club had been relegated from the division before April and sealing the club's first immediate relegation following promotion in its history. Poor results continued: a 6–0 home defeat at the hands of Aston Villa on 12 April 2008 is the biggest defeat at Pride Park and, by the season's end, Derby had recorded the Premier League's lowest points total and equalled Loughborough's 108-year Football League record of going through an entire season with only one win. Their final game of the season was a 4–0 home defeat to Reading, who were also relegated.

League table
Manchester United were Premier League Champions in the 2007/2008 Season.

Playing squad
Squad at end of season

Left club during season

Transfers

Summer 2007 transfer window

In
 29 June 2007 – Robert Earnshaw – £3.5m, from Norwich City 
 4 July 2007 – Tyrone Mears – £1m, from West Ham United
 7 July 2007 – Andy Todd – £750k, from Blackburn Rovers
 10 July 2007 – Ben Hinchliffe – free transfer
 25 July 2007 – Claude Davis – £3m, from Sheffield United
 26 July 2007 – Lewis Price – undisclosed, from Ipswich Town
 1 August 2007 – Andy Griffin – free transfer from Portsmouth
 10 August 2007 – Benny Feilhaber – undisclosed, from Hamburg
 20 August 2007 – Eddie Lewis – undisclosed, from Leeds United
 31 August 2007 – Kenny Miller – £2.25m, from Celtic

Out
 31 May 2007 – Seth Johnson – retirement
 31 May 2007 – Lionel Ainsworth – released
 31 May 2007 – Morten Bisgaard – released
 31 May 2007 – Paul Boertien – released
 31 May 2007 – Steven Cann – released
 31 May 2007 – Tom Cumberworth – released
 31 May 2007 – Lee Grant – released
 5 July 2007 – Ryan Smith – £150k, to Millwall
 27 July 2007 – Lee Camp – £200k, to Queens Park Rangers
 31 July 2007 – James Meredith – free transfer to Sligo Rovers
 8 August 2007 – Richard Jackson – free transfer to Luton Town

January 2008 transfer window

In
 4 January 2008 – Danny Mills – on loan from Manchester City
 4 January 2008 – Emanuel Villa – £2m, from Estudiantes Tecos
 9 January 2008 – Laurent Robert – free transfer
 9 January 2008 – Robbie Savage – £1.5m, from Blackburn Rovers
 11 January 2008 – Hossam Ghaly – on loan from Tottenham Hotspur
 31 January 2008 – Roy Carroll – free transfer from Rangers
 31 January 2008 – Mile Sterjovski – undisclosed, from Gençlerbirliği
 31 January 2008 – Alan Stubbs – free transfer from Everton
 11 April 2008 – Ruben Zadkovich – free transfer from Sydney FC

Out
 3 January 2008 – Steve Howard – £1.25m, to Leicester City
 11 January 2008 – Andy Griffin – £300k, to Stoke City
 11 January 2008 – Matt Oakley – £500k, to Leicester City
 28 January 2008 – Jon Macken – £200k, to Barnsley
 31 January 2008 – Bob Malcolm – contract terminated
 31 January 2008 – Lewin Nyatanga – loan to Barnsley
 29 February 2008 – Michael Johnson – loan to Notts County
 2 April 2008 – Laurent Robert – free transfer to Toronto FC

Results

Premier League

FA Cup

Football League Cup

Squad statistics

Appearances, goals and cards

Notes

References

External links
Derby County FC official site
Derby County FC on Soccerbase

Derby County F.C. seasons
Derby County